The Europeans cricket team was a cricket team based in Ceylon and composed of colonial officials.  The team played a single first-class match in January 1927 against the touring Marylebone Cricket Club. The match, which was played at the Colombo Cricket Club Ground, ended in a draw.

Scorecard

References

External links
Europeans (Ceylon) at CricketArchive

Former senior cricket clubs of Sri Lanka
Sports clubs in Colombo